Kim Min-Jung (Hangul: 김민정, Hanja: 金玟廷, born March 20, 1985 in Seoul) is a South Korean short track speed skater.

Kim won her first senior World Championship individual gold medal in the women's 1500 meter at the 2009 World Short Track Speed Skating Championships held in Vienna, edging out future 1500 meter Olympic champion Zhou Yang by 0.503 seconds.

In the 2010 Vancouver Winter Olympics, she competed only in the women's 3000 meter relay, combining with Lee Eun-Byul, Park Seung-Hi and Cho Ha-Ri. The South Korean team finished first but was controversially disqualified due to contact between Kim and Sun Linlin of China.

See also 
 South Korea at the 2010 Winter Olympics

References

External links
 Kim Min-Jung's biography on nbcolympics.com

1985 births
Living people
South Korean female short track speed skaters
Olympic short track speed skaters of South Korea
Short track speed skaters at the 2010 Winter Olympics
Asian Games medalists in short track speed skating
Asian Games silver medalists for South Korea
Short track speed skaters at the 2007 Asian Winter Games
Medalists at the 2007 Asian Winter Games
Universiade medalists in short track speed skating
World Short Track Speed Skating Championships medalists
Universiade gold medalists for South Korea
Universiade silver medalists for South Korea
Competitors at the 2005 Winter Universiade
Competitors at the 2011 Winter Universiade
South Korean Buddhists
21st-century South Korean women